Shredding Green is a hamlet in the parish of Iver (where the 2011 Census was included), in Buckinghamshire, England.

Hamlets in Buckinghamshire